Huai'an District is one of four districts of the prefecture-level city of Huai'an, Jiangsu Province, China. The southeast district was formerly named Shanyang County, Huai'an County and Chuzhou District.

The district is the home town of historical figures such as  Zhou Enlai, Wu Cheng'en, Han Xin and Guan Tianpei

Administrative divisions
In the present, Huai'an District has 21 towns and 6 townships.
21 towns

6 townships

References

www.xzqh.org

External links 

County-level divisions of Jiangsu
Huai'an